Laguna Carén is a lagoon and wetland located in the commune of Pudahuel, Santiago Province, Santiago Metropolitan Region, Chile. The lagoon obtained its name from the Mapuche term karv we, meaning "green place".

See also 

 Laguna de Aculeo
 Laguna Redonda

References 

Lagoons of Chile
Landforms of Santiago Metropolitan Region